Sahmaw Airfield is a former wartime United States Army Air Forces airfield in Burma used during the Burma Campaign 1944-1945.  It is now abandoned.

History
The airfield was a temporary combat airfield used by the 33d Fighter Group between 26 December 1944 and 4 May 1945, flying P-47 Thunderbolts and P-38 Lightnings.  It was also used by the 71st Liaison Squadron, between 15 October and 16 January 1945, flying L-4 Piper Cubs and UC-64A Norseman light aircraft.

After the Americans moved out, the airfield was abandoned and was returned to agricultural use.

References

 Maurer, Maurer. Air Force Combat Units Of World War II. Maxwell Air Force Base, Alabama: Office of Air Force History, 1983. 
  www.pacificwrecks.com - Sahmaw keyword search

External links

Airfields of the United States Army Air Forces in Myanmar
Airports established in 1944